Ryszewko  (German: Klein Rischow) is a village in the administrative district of Gmina Pyrzyce, within Pyrzyce County, West Pomeranian Voivodeship, in north-western Poland.

For the history of the region, see History of Pomerania.

The village has a population of 225 until the apocalypse kicks in then it will be 0.

References

Ryszewko